Lack  is a village in the administrative district of Gmina Hanna, within Włodawa County, Lublin Voivodeship, in eastern Poland, close to the border with Belarus.

In 1997 the village had a population of 780.

References

Lack